Saint-Eugène-de-Ladrière is a parish municipality in the Rimouski-Neigette Regional County Municipality in the Bas-Saint-Laurent region of Quebec, Canada.

On July 6, 2002, unorganized territory Grand-Lac-Touradi was annexed by Saint-Eugène-de-Ladrière.

Demographics 

See also
 List of parish municipalities in Quebec

References

External links
 

Parish municipalities in Quebec
Incorporated places in Bas-Saint-Laurent